Skenario Masa Muda is the first EP released by Indonesian band White Shoes & the Couples Company. It was released in 2007 on both Aksara Records (the Indonesian label) and Minty Fresh, the American label.

Track listing 
"Prelude"
"Super Reuni"
"Pelan Tapi Pasti"
"Roman Ketiga"
"Today Is No Sunday"
"Aksi Kucing"

2007 debut EPs
White Shoes & The Couples Company albums